Aleksey Yevgenevich Potekhin (born 15 April 1972) is a Russian pop musician. Alongside Sergey Zhukov, Potekhin was a member of the successful pop/techno band Hands Up! until it dissolved in 2006.

Career
After the break-up of Hands Up! in 2006, Potekhin continued with a solo music career and produced acts like Superboys, and J Well (the former member of Discomafia). 

Between 2006 and 2008, he released 3 collections of dance music on the website "potexinstyle.ru", that included young acts Demo, Turbomoda, and Planka Etc. Potekhin has also produced Trek/Blues led by Vladimir Luchnikov, the lead singer of Turbomoda and Svoi of Ruslan Achkinadze. Aleksey is the older brother of Andrei Potekhin, ex-member of Turbomoda and Revolvers. Andrei manages Aleksey Potekhin's new project of Trek/Blues.

References

1972 births
Living people
Russian dance musicians
Russian pop musicians
Russian record producers
Russian DJs
People from Novokuybyshevsk